Harrison Allen (1841–1897) was an American physician and anatomist, born in Philadelphia.  He graduated from the medical department of the University of Pennsylvania in 1861, and in 1862 became a surgeon in the United States Army and served until the conclusion of the Civil War in 1865.

In 1865 he was made professor of comparative anatomy and medical zoölogy at the University of Pennsylvania.  He was transferred in 1878 to the chair of physiology, which he occupied until 1895.

In 1867, he was elected as a member to the American Philosophical Society.

He is buried at West Laurel Hill Cemetery, Lansdowne Section, Lot 205, in Bala Cynwyd, Pennsylvania.

Publications
In addition to many papers contributed to medical journals, he authored a number of books:
 Outlines of Comparative Anatomy and Medical Zoölogy (1867)
 Studies in the Facial Region (1874)
 An Analysis of the Life Form in Art (1875)
 System of Human Anatomy'' (1880)

References

External links 

 
 
 
 

19th-century American physicians
1841 births
1897 deaths
American male non-fiction writers
American medical writers
American surgeons
American zoologists
Burials at West Laurel Hill Cemetery
Members of the American Philosophical Society
Perelman School of Medicine at the University of Pennsylvania alumni
Physicians from Philadelphia
Union Army officers
University of Pennsylvania faculty